The 1939 Saint Mary's Gaels football team was an American football team that represented Saint Mary's College of California during the 1939 college football season.  In their 19th and final season under head coach Slip Madigan, the Gaels compiled a 3–4–1 record and outscored their opponents by a combined total of 84 to 57.

Schedule

References

Saint Mary's
Saint Mary's Gaels football seasons
Saint Mary's Gaels football